Fancy Color Research Foundation (FCRF) is a non-profit organization that promotes the transparency and fair trade for the fancy colored diamonds industry. The foundation was officially inaugurated in November 2014. The FCRF conducts research on all aspects of fancy color diamonds and publishes quarterly updates of the Fancy Color Diamond Index (FCDI), which illustrates changes in the wholesale buying price of fancy color diamonds. In recent years the FCRF has developed other services for the benefit of the diamond industry. A proprietary database that enables to determine the rarity of a fancy color diamond, an objective pre-auction analysis and a non-biased valuation for fancy color diamonds. The foundation operates from the Israel Diamond Exchange, with branches in the UK and US.

The Fancy Color Diamond index is based on actual buying prices, contributed by prominent fancy color diamond manufacturers and traders around the world. The input is analyzed and published quarterly in the media.  

The Rarity Report is based on an ongoing analysis of data coming in from multiple sources such as mining companies, G.I.A, Online database, and market provenance from wholesalers. 

Pre-Auction analysis articles are based on the valuation methodology from “Fancy color diamonds- The Pricing architecture” book authored by Eden Rachminov. The analysis is published prior to the diamond and jewelry auctions in Hong-Kong, Geneva and New-York, in order to give a third party objective description to the public.

History 

The Fancy Color Research Foundation was founded in 2005 when the organization began to collect data for fancy color diamond wholesale market prices. Data was collected for nearly ten years before the first quarterly update of the Fancy Color Diamond Index (FCDI) in January 2015. In addition to the FCDI, the foundation publishes proprietary research articles and develops digital tools for the fancy color diamond segment.

Research 

FCRF publishes research articles on fancy color topics such as pre-auction analyses, market research and a range of industry specific subjects. From 2005 to 2014, the FCRF confirmed that fancy color diamonds have experienced an average total appreciation of 154.7%. Financial Times reported that Daniela Mascetti, a senior specialist in the international jewelry department at Sotheby's, has expressed interest in the FCRF's data because “the fancy coloured diamonds category is hugely nuanced and subjective."

Philanthropy 

The majority of the Fancy Color Research Foundation’s income is reinvested in further research and education, and any surplus is donated to the Make-A-Wish Foundation.

References

External links 
 http://www.fcresearch.org
Diamond industry in Israel
Foundations based in Israel
Market research organizations